Fort Scott may refer to any of five places for which General Winfield Scott, former General-in-Chief of the U.S. Army, was namesake:
 Fort Scott, Kansas, a city that grew up around a military fort of the same name
 Fort Scott National Historic Site
 Fort Scott (Flint River, Georgia), a small fortification on the Flint River near the Georgia/Florida border, built in 1816 as a staging base for operations against Creek and Seminole Indians operating in western Spanish Florida; see First Seminole War
 Fort Scott (Arlington, Virginia), a small fortification in Arlington, Virginia, built to defend Washington during the American Civil War
 Fort Winfield Scott, a coast artillery post created within the Presidio of San Francisco in 1912
 Fort Point, San Francisco, renamed Fort Winfield Scott in 1882 but reverted to the original name before the establishment of the coast artillery post

See also
 Fort Scott Camp